Sadney Urikhob (born 19 January 1992) is a Namibian footballer who plays as a forward.

Career

Police Tero F.C. 
In July 2017, he confirmed that he has signed an 18-month contract with a new club Police Tero in the Thai League 1, following his departure from Super Power Samut Prakan formerly known as Osotspa player last December.

PSMS Medan
On 26 December 2017, Sadney signed a contract with Indonesian Liga 1 club PSMS Medan on a free transfer, along with former Indonesia national team player, Yongki Aribowo.

Young Africans S.C.
In July 2019, Urikhob joined Tanzanian club Young Africans. On 11 December 2019 it was confirmed, that Urikhob had left the club. It was later revealed, that he left by his own request after the club was struggling to pay salaries.

Chiangmai F.C.
Left without club, Urikhob returned to Thailand and joined Chiangmai in February 2020.

International goals
Scores and results list Namibia's goal tally first.

References

External links

1992 births
Living people
Footballers from Windhoek
Association football forwards
Namibia international footballers
Expatriate soccer players in South Africa
Expatriate footballers in Thailand
Expatriate footballers in Tanzania
Namibian expatriate sportspeople in South Africa
Namibian expatriate sportspeople in Thailand
AmaZulu F.C. players
Sadney Urikhob
Sadney Urikhob
PSMS Medan players
Young Africans S.C. players
Sadney Urikhob
South African Premier Division players
Sadney Urikhob
Liga 1 (Indonesia) players
Tanzanian Premier League players
Nakhon Si United F.C. players
Namibian men's footballers